is an athletic stadium in Wakayama, Wakayama, Japan.

External links
  

Football venues in Japan
Sports venues in Wakayama Prefecture
Arterivo Wakayama
Wakayama (city)
Sports venues completed in 1964
1964 establishments in Japan